Claus Günter Vogt (born 12 August 1969 in Nürtingen) is a German football chairman. He is president of VfB Stuttgart since 15 December 2019.

Vogt founded the facility management company Intesia Group Holding. In January 2017, he founded the club FC PlayFair!, which stands up for integrity in professional football.

On 15 December 2019, Vogt was elected as new president of VfB Stuttgart. In July 2021, Vogt was re-elected for four years.

References

1969 births
Living people
German football chairmen and investors
VfB Stuttgart people